Jin Jian (born 9 March 1994) is a Chinese bobsledder. He competed in the two-man event at the 2018 Winter Olympics.

References

External links
 

1994 births
Living people
Chinese male bobsledders
Olympic bobsledders of China
Bobsledders at the 2018 Winter Olympics
Place of birth missing (living people)